Iman Alemi (born 24 February 1968) is a retired Iranian football player who played for Iran national football team in 1994 Asian Games. He formerly played for Esteghlal, Sepahan and the Iran national football team.

References

1968 births
Living people
Iranian footballers
Iran international footballers
Esteghlal F.C. players
Sepahan S.C. footballers
Iman Alami
Binh Dinh FC players
Azadegan League players
V.League 1 players
Association football midfielders
Iranian expatriate footballers
Iranian expatriate sportspeople in Thailand
Iranian expatriate sportspeople in Vietnam
Expatriate footballers in Thailand
Expatriate footballers in Vietnam
Footballers at the 1994 Asian Games
Asian Games competitors for Iran